Porrhostaspis is a genus of mites in the family Parasitidae.

Species
 Porrhostaspis setosa Gu & Liu, 1996

References

Parasitidae